Secession in India typically refers to state secession, which is the withdrawal of one or more states from the Republic of India. Whereas, some have wanted a separate state, union territory or an autonomous administrative division within India. Many separatist movements exist with thousands of members, however, some have low local support and high voter participation in democratic elections. However, at the same time, demanding separate statehood within under the administration of Indian union from an existing state can lead to criminal charges under secession law in India. India is described as a ‘Union of States’ in Article 1 of the Indian constitution I.e indestructible nation of destructible states where a state or Union territory of India can't secede from India by any means.

The Naxal-Maoist insurgency began in India with the Naxalbari uprsing in 1967 in West Bengal. Later it also spread to the southern states of India. Currently, it is led by the Communist Party of India (Maoists) and are active in some areas of the states of Chhattisgarh, Bihar, Jharkhand, Maharashtra, Odisha, Andhra Pradesh and Telangana. The areas where Naxals operate is known as the Red Corridor. Their support mainly lies with the tribal population of India who have often been neglected by the elected government.

The Khalistan movement in Punjab was active in the 1980s and early 1990s, but was suppressed and eventually died down. 
Secessionist movements in Northeast India involve multiple armed separatist factions operating in India's northeastern states, which are connected to the rest of India by the Siliguri Corridor, a strip of land as narrow as 14.29 miles (23.00 km) wide. Northeastern India consists of the seven states of Assam, Meghalaya, Tripura, Arunachal Pradesh, Mizoram, Manipur, and Nagaland. Tensions existed between insurgents in these states and the central government as well as amongst their native indigenous people and migrants from other parts of India. Insurgency has seen rapid decline in recent years, with a 70% reduction in insurgency incidents and an 80% drop in civilian deaths in the Northeast in 2019 compared to 2013. The 2014 Indian general election the Indian government claimed it had an 80% voter turnout in all northeastern states, the highest among all states of India. Indian authorities claim that this shows the faith of the northeastern people in Indian democracy. Insurgency has largely become insignificant due to lack of local public support and the area of violence in the entire North East has shrunk primarily to an area which is the tri-junction between Assam, Arunachal Pradesh and north Nagaland.

Jammu and Kashmir has long been wracked by the insurgency since 1989. Although the failure of Indian governance and democracy lay at the root of the initial disaffection, Pakistan played an important role in converting the latter into a fully developed insurgency. Some insurgent groups in Kashmir support complete independence, whereas others seek accession to Pakistan. More explicitly, the roots of the insurgency are tied to a dispute over local autonomy. Democratic development was limited in Kashmir until the late 1970s and by 1988 many of the democratic reforms provided by the Indian government had been reversed and non-violent channels for expressing discontent were limited and caused a dramatic increase in support for insurgents advocating violent secession from India. In 1987, a disputed State election  which is widely perceived to have been rigged, created a catalyst for the insurgency. In 2019, the special status of Jammu and Kashmir was revoked. Since then, the Indian military has intensified its counter-insurgency operations. Clashes in the first half of 2020 left 283 dead. The 2019–2021 Jammu and Kashmir lockdown was a security lockdown and communications blackout that had been imposed throughout Jammu and Kashmir which lasted until February 2021, with the goal of preemptively curbing unrest, violence and protests. Thousands of civilians, mostly young men, had and have been detained in the crackdown. The Indian government had stated that the tough lockdown measures and substantially increased deployment of security forces had been aimed at curbing terrorism.  The revocation and subsequent lockdown drew condemnation from several countries, especially Pakistan.

India has introduced several laws like the Armed Forces Special Powers Acts (AFSPA) to subdue insurgency in certain parts of the country. The law was first enforced in Manipur and later enforced in other insurgency-ridden north-eastern states. It was extended to most parts of the Indian state of Jammu and Kashmir in 1990 after the outbreak of an armed insurgency in 1989. Each Act gives soldiers immunity in specified regions against prosecution under state government unless the Indian government gives prior sanction for such prosecution. The government maintains that the AFSPA is necessary to restore order in regions like Indian territories of Kashmir and Manipur.  The act has been criticized by Human Rights Watch as a "tool of state abuse, oppression and discrimination".  On 31 March 2012, the UN asked India to revoke AFSPA saying it had no place in Indian democracy.

Causes 
While the causes of the many insurgencies are varied, they can usually be explained by a few broad problems. Mainly, lack of development and democratic initiatives taken up by the elected government. Land, especially forest mismanagement. Lack of a consolidated unifying identity leading to exploitation of caste, ethnic, language or religious barriers and geographical Terrain. And the many counterinsurgency measures taken by the government that have often backfired.

The lack of industrial initiatives and the half-hearted implementation of land reforms by the elected government has yielded negative results. The people feel alienated and excluded which often leads to anger and resentment.  In addition, local elites often engage in exploiting, harassing and even torturing the tribal populations. The insurgent group often take up the role of the government by  providing medical assistance, etc. The Naxalites also provide a monthly salary and uniform for recruits (money that has been collected by companies operating on Naxal areas.) As a result, they have become popular amongst the unemployed youths.

According to an ex-Naxalite who was interviewed by the Economic TimesThe MCC (Maoist Communist Centre) received funds in the form of levy, donations or grains and part of it was spent on the “welfare" of people. We opened schools, built dams. This gave me the feeling, I was indeed working for the people.This is why the Naxalite and other insurgent groups are popular among the Dalit and Adivasi communities who are said to be socially, politically and economically marginalized.

In Kashmir, democratic development was limited until the late 1970s and by 1988 many of the democratic reforms provided by the Indian government had been reversed and non-violent channels for expressing discontent were limited and caused a dramatic increase in support for insurgents advocating violent secession from India. In 1987, elections in Jammu Kashmir which have been widely perceived to be rigged caused mass civil unrests and demonstrations.

Religious or ethnic differences have also played a role in amplifying the insurgent movements. For example, after the Soviet withdrawal from Afghanistan, many Islamic "Jihad" fighters (Mujahideen) had entered the Kashmir valley and several new militant groups with radical Islamic views emerged. Militant groups like Hizbul mujahideen and Lashkar-e-Taiba asserted that struggle of Kashmir will continue till an Islamic Caliphate is achieved in Kashmir. Murder of Kashmiri Hindus, intellectuals, Pro-Indian politicians and activists were described necessary to get rid of un-Islamic elements. In Assam, tension exist between the native indigenous Assamese people and immigration from Bangladesh. The ULFA has attacked Hindi-speaking migrant workers. MULTA on the other hand seeks to establish an Islamic state in India via jihadist struggle of Muslims of both indigenous and migrant origin.

Geographical terrain also plays a major role as many militants are most active in the remote forest areas of India.

Finally, the various counter-insurgent movements initiated by the government has often backfired and resulted in more insurgency. A vicious cycle often happens where the government resorts to the use of excessive force resulting in even more people joining insurgent groups. Like, in the case of the Aizawl airstrike, Pu Zoramthanga, who went on to become the Chief Minister of Mizoram in 1998, once said that the main reason he joined the MNF and became a rebel was the "relentless bombing of Aizawl in 1966". In Kashmir,  Human Rights Watch has stated in a 1993 report that Indian security forces "assaulted civilians during search operations, tortured and summarily executed detainees in custody and murdered civilians in reprisal attacks"; according to the report, militants had also targeted civilians, but to a lesser extent than security forces. Rape was regularly used as a means to "punish and humiliate" communities. In response, the Indian Army claims that 97% of the reports about the human rights abuse are "fake or motivated" based on the investigation performed by the Army. However, a report by the US State Department said, "Indian authorities use Armed Forces Special Powers Act (AFSPA) to avoid holding its security forces responsible for the deaths of civilians in Jammu and Kashmir." These human rights violations are said to have contributed to the rise of resistance in Kashmir. According to the Home Ministry, "A total of 120 incidents have been reported till July 15 this year while 188 incidents were reported last year. But what is causing a serious concern is the number of local terrorists getting killed indicating that recruitment is on the rise in the valley."

Acts intended to curb terrorism like the Armed Forces (Special Powers) Act and Unlawful Activities (Prevention) Act has been criticized by many human rights organizations. The South Asian Human Rights Documentation Centre argues that the governments' call for increased force is part of the insurgency problem.This reasoning exemplifies the vicious cycle which has been instituted in the North East due to the AFSPA. The use of the AFSPA pushes the demand for more autonomy, giving the people of the North East more reason to want to secede from a state which enacts such powers and the agitation which ensues continues to justify the use of the AFSPA from the point of view of the Indian Government.

Naxal-Maoist insurgency 

The Naxalite–Maoist insurgency is an ongoing conflict between Maoist groups known as Naxalites or Naxals, and the Indian government. It started with an armed uprising initiated in 1967 by a radical faction of the Communist Party of India (Marxist) (CPI-M) led by Charu Majumdar, Kanu Sanyal, and Jangal Santhal. Former Prime Minister Manmohan Singh has called it the, "biggest threat to internal security."

History

Phase 1 (1967–1973) 

Mao Zedong provided ideological inspiration for the Naxalbari movement. A large number of urban elites were also attracted to the ideology, which spread through Charu Majumdar's writings, particularly the Historic Eight Documents. These documents were essays formed from the opinions of many communist leaders.

On 18 May 1967, the Siliguri Kishan Sabha declared their support for the movement initiated by Kanu Sanyal, and their readiness to adopt armed struggle to redistribute land to the landless. The CPI (M) who was then in power in West Bengal did not approve of an armed uprising. On 25 May 1967 in Naxalbari, Darjeeling district, a sharecropper of tribal background (Adivasi) who had been given land by the courts under the tenancy laws was attacked by the landlord's men. In retaliation, tribals started forcefully capturing back their lands. When a police team arrived, they were ambushed by a group of tribals led by Jangal Santhal, and a police inspector was killed in a hail of arrows. This event encouraged many Santhal tribals and other poor people to join the movement and to start attacking local landlords. Violent uprisings were organized in several parts of the country by the AICCCR.

On 22 April 1969 (Lenin's birthday), the AICCCR gave birth to the Communist Party of India (Marxist–Leninist) (CPI (ML)). The party was formed by the radicals of the CPI-M like Majumdar and Saroj Dutta. The first party congress was held in Calcutta in 1970 where a Central Committee was elected. However, due to infighting the party soon split. In 1971 Satyanarayan Singh revolted against the leadership and sectarianism of Majumdar. The result became that the party was split into two, one CPI (ML) led by Satyanarayan Singh and one CPI (ML) led by Majumdar. After Majumdar died in police custody, the party split into pro-and anti-Majumdar factions. The pro-Majmumdar factions further split into pro-and anti-Lin Biao factions.

The government also retaliated by several operations notably Operation Steeplechase by Indira Gandhi. By 1973 the main cadres of the Naxalites had been eliminated and were dead or behind bars. The movement fractured into more than 40 separate small groups. As a result, instead of popular armed struggle in the countryside, individual terrorism in Calcutta became a principal method of struggle.

Phase 2 (1977–1994) 
The early 1970s saw the spread of Naxalism to almost every state in India, barring Western India. This time, the insurgency was done in South India particularly in the state of Andhra Pradesh.

On April 22, 1980, the Communist Party of India (Marxist–Leninist) People's War was founded by Kondapalli Seetharamaia By 1978 Naxalite peasant revolts had spread to the Karimnagar District and Adilabad District. These new waves of insurgents kidnapped landlords and forced them to confess to crimes, apologize to villagers, and repay forced bribes. By the early 1980s insurgents had established a stronghold and sanctuary in the interlinked North Telangana village and Dandakaranya forests areas along the Andhra Pradesh and Orissa border.

The governments of Andhra Pradesh and Orissa managed to quell down the rebels with a variety of counterinsurgency measures. After the death of a police sub-inspector in Warangal  IPS officer K. S. Vyas raised a special task force called the Greyhounds. The states established special laws that enabled police to  capture and detain Naxalite cadres, fighters and presumed supporters. They also invited additional central paramilitary forces. The states also set up rehabilitation programs (like the Surrender and Rehabilitation package) and established new informant networks. By 1994, nearly 9000 Naxalites surrendered. In 2003 following an attack on the then Chief Minister Chandrababu Naidu, the state embarked on a rapid modernization of its police force while ramping up its technical and operational capabilities. By the early 2000s, Andhra Pradesh and Telangana saw a very minimal Naxal presence.

Phase 3 (2004–Present) 

The Communist Party of India (Maoist) was founded on 21 September 2004, through the merger of the Communist Party of India (Marxist–Leninist) People's War (People's War Group), and the Maoist Communist Centre of India (MCCI) and  the Communist Party of India (Marxist–Leninist) Naxalbari into the CPI (Maoist).

The CPI (Maoist) is active in the forest belt of Chhattisgarh, Bihar, Jharkhand, Maharashtra, Odisha and some remote regions of Jharkhand and Andhra Pradesh and Telangana.

It has carried out several attacks (see Timeline of the Naxalite–Maoist insurgency) notably on 15 February 2010, several of the guerrilla commanders of CPI (Maoist) killed 24 personnel of the Eastern Frontier Rifles. On 6 April 2010, the Maoists ambushed and killed 76 paramilitary personnel who felled out to the trap laid by the lurking Maoists. On 25 May 2013, the CPI (Maoist) ambushed a convoy of the Indian National Congress at Bastar, and killed 27 people including Mahendra Karma, Nand Kumar Patel and Vidya Charan Shukla. On 3 April 2021, twenty-two soldiers were killed in a Maoist ambush on the border of Bijapur and Sukma districts in southern Chhattisgarh.

In September 2009, a all-out offensive was launched by the Government of India's paramilitary forces and the state's police forces against the Naxals. This operation was termed by the Indian media as "Operation Green Hunt." Since the start of the operation 2,266 Maoist militants have been killed, 10,181 have been arrested and 9,714 have surrendered.

Ideology and Funding 
The Naxals are  far-left radical communists who form many groups with varying ideologies. The CPI(ML) and People's War Group (PWG) believed in Marxist–Leninism whereas the current CPI(Maoist) believe in Maoism. They believe that the Indian state is being "run by a collaboration of imperialists, the comprador bourgeoisie and feudal lords and wish to overthrow it through extreme violence as a means to secure organisational goals The Naxals have support mainly in the tribal (Adivasi) community. This is due to the mismanagement of forests both in British and independent eras. The lack of development in rural areas by the government is usually filled by the Naxals. The Naxalites receive support from Dalits and Adivasis who among these groups persists low degree of employment and qualification, weak access to health care, education and power, political marginalization and suppression of protests.

They usually earn money through the mining industry where they tax about 3% of the profits from each mining company that operate in the areas under Naxal control. These firms also pay the Naxalites for "protection" services which allow miners to work without having to worry about Naxalite attacks. The organization also funds itself through the drug trade, where it cultivates drugs in areas of Orissa, Andhra Pradesh, Jharkhand, and Bihar. Drugs such as marijuana and opium are distributed throughout the country by middlemen who work on behalf of the Naxalites. The drug trade is extremely profitable for the movement, as about 40% of Naxal funding comes through the cultivation and distribution of opium.

Jammu and Kashmir 

Maharaja Hari Singh became the ruler of the princely state of Jammu and Kashmir in 1925, and he was the reigning monarch after the British rule in the subcontinent in 1947. With the impending independence of India, the British announced that the British Paramountcy over the princely states would end, and the states were free to choose between the new Dominions of India and Pakistan or to remain independent.  It was emphasized that independence was only a `theoretical possibility' because, during the long rule of the British in India, the states had come to depend on the British Indian government for a variety of their needs including their internal and external security.

Jammu and Kashmir had a Muslim majority (77% Muslim by the previous census in 1941). Following the logic of Partition, many people in Pakistan expected that Kashmir would join Pakistan. However, the predominant political movement in the Valley of Kashmir (Jammu and Kashmir National Conference) was secular and was allied with the Indian National Congress since the 1930s. So many in India too had expectations that Kashmir would join India. The Maharaja was faced with indecision.

On 22 October 1947, rebellious citizens from the western districts of the State and Pushtoon tribesmen from the Northwest Frontier Province of Pakistan invaded the State, backed by Pakistan. The Maharaja initially fought back but appealed for assistance to India, who agreed on the condition that the ruler accede to India. Maharaja Hari Singh signed the Instrument of Accession on 26 October 1947 in return for military aid and assistance, which was accepted by the Governor-General the next day. While the Government of India accepted the accession, it added the proviso that it would be submitted to a "reference to the people" after the state is cleared of the invaders, since "only the people, not the Maharaja, could decide where Kashmiris wanted to live." It was a provisional accession.

Once the Instrument of Accession was signed, Indian soldiers entered Kashmir with orders to evict the raiders. The resulting Indo-Pakistani War of 1947 lasted till the end of 1948. At the beginning of 1948, India took the matter to the United Nations Security Council. The Security Council passed a resolution asking Pakistan to withdraw its forces as well as the Pakistani nationals from the territory of Jammu and Kashmir, and India to withdraw the majority of its forces leaving only a sufficient number to maintain law and order, following which a plebiscite would be held. A ceasefire was agreed on 1 January 1949, supervised by UN observers.

A special United Nations Commission for India and Pakistan (UNCIP) was set up to negotiate the withdrawal arrangements as per the Security Council resolution. The UNCIP made three visits to the subcontinent between 1948 and 1949, trying to find a solution agreeable to both India and Pakistan. It passed a resolution in August 1948 proposing a three-part process. It was accepted by India but effectively rejected by Pakistan.
In the end, no withdrawal was ever carried out, India insisting that Pakistan had to withdraw first, and Pakistan contending that there was no guarantee that India would withdraw afterwards. No agreement could be reached between the two countries on the process of demilitarization.

India and Pakistan fought two further wars in 1965 and 1971. Following the latter war, the countries reached the Simla Agreement, agreeing on a Line of Control between their respective regions and committing to a peaceful resolution of the dispute through bilateral negotiations.

On 5 August 2019, the Government of India revoked the special status, or limited autonomy, granted under Article 370 of the Indian Constitution to Jammu and Kashmir—a region administered by India as a state which consists of the larger part of Kashmir and has been the subject of dispute among India, Pakistan, and China since 1947. The state has been bifurcated into two union territories of Jammu and Kashmir, and Ladakh.

Punjab

Khalistan 
The Khalistan movement aims to create a homeland for Sikhs by establishing a sovereign state, called Khālistān ('Land of the Khalsa'), in the Punjab region. The territorial definition of the proposed Khalistan consists of state of Punjab, India (including parts of Haryana and Himachal Pradesh which were previously part of Punjab) and sometimes also includes Punjab, Pakistan.

The call for a separate Sikh state began in the wake of the fall of the British Empire. In 1940, the first explicit call for Khalistan was made in a pamphlet titled "Khalistan". With financial and political support of the Sikh diaspora, the movement flourished in the Indian state of Punjab – which has a Sikh-majority population – continuing through the 1970s and 1980s, and reaching its zenith in the late 1980s.

In June 1984, the Indian Government ordered a military operation, Operation Blue Star to clear Harmandir Sahib, Amritsar of militant Sikhs led by Jarnail Singh Bhindranwale. The military action in the temple complex was criticized by Sikhs worldwide, who interpreted it as an assault on the Sikh religion. Five months after the operation, on 31 October 1984, Indira Gandhi was assassinated in an act of revenge by her two Sikh bodyguards, Satwant Singh and Beant Singh. Public outcry over Gandhi's death led to the killings of more than 3,000 Sikhs in Delhi alone in the ensuing 1984 anti-Sikh riots. In the 1990s, the insurgency petered out, and the movement failed to reach its objective due to multiple reasons including a heavy police crackdown on separatists, factional infighting, and disillusionment from the Sikh population. Chief Minister of Punjab Amarinder Singh claimed that the recent extremism is backed by Pakistan's Inter-Services Intelligence (ISI) and Khalistani sympathizers in Canada, Italy, and the UK.

Assam 

   
Assam has been a refuge for militants for several years, due to its porous borders with Bangladesh and Bhutan and also due to its very close proximity to Burma. The main causes of the friction include anti-foreigner agitation in the 1980s and the simmering indigenous-migrant tensions. The insurgency status in Assam is classified as "very active". The government of Bangladesh has arrested and extradited senior leaders of the ULFA.

United Liberation Front of Asom (1979–present) 
The United Liberation Front of Asom was formed in April 1979 to establish a sovereign state of Assam for the indigenous people of Assam through an armed struggle. The Government of India had banned the ULFA in 1990 and has officially labelled it as a terrorist group, whereas the US State Department lists it under "Other groups of concern". Military operations against it by the Indian Army that began in 1990 continue to the present. In the past two decades, some 10,000 people have died in the clash between the rebels and the government. The Assamese secessionist groups have protested against the illegal migration from the neighbouring regions. In the mid-20th century, people from present-day Bangladesh (then known as East Pakistan) migrated to Assam. In 1961, the Government of Assam passed legislation making use of Assamese language compulsory which had to be withdrawn later under pressure from Bengali speaking people of the Barak Valley. In the 1980s the Brahmaputra valley saw six years of Assam agitation triggered by the discovery of a sudden rise in registered voters on electoral rolls. In recent times the organisation has lost its middle rung leaders after most of them were arrested.

Muslim United Liberation Tigers of Assam (1996–present) 
The Muslim United Liberation Tigers of Assam (MULTA), established in 1996, advocates a separate country for the Muslims of the region.

Karbi Separatism (1999–2021)

United People's Democratic Solidarity (1999–2014) 

The United People's Democratic Solidarity (UPDS) demands a sovereign nation for the Karbi people. It was formed in March 1999 with the merger of two militant outfits in Assam's Karbi Anglong district, the Karbi National Volunteers (KNV) and Karbi People's Front (KPF). The UPDS signed a cease-fire agreement for one year with the Indian Government on 23 May 2002. However, this led to a split in the UPDS with one faction deciding to continue with its subversive activities (the KLNCHLF) while the other commenced negotiations with the Government. As of 14 December 2014, The UPDS has formally disbanded following the mass surrender of all its cadres and leaders. Karbi separatists signed a peace deal with the Indian government on 5 September 2021.

Karbi Longri North Cachar Hills Liberation Front (2002–2021) 

  KLNLF emerged from the United People's Democratic Solidarity, being against the peace talks between the UDPS and the government. After the split, there have been turf wars between the two groups. In July 2008, the Assam government estimated that KLNLF had a membership of 225. KLNLF is closely linked to the United Liberation Front of Asom. 6 December is the foundation day of KLNLF. On 23 February 2021, KLNLF  was disbanded. All its members surrendered to state government.

Kamtapur Liberation Organization (1995–present) 

 
The Kamtapur Liberation Organisation (KLO) came into existence on December 28, 1995, with an objective to carve out a separate Kamtapur Nation. The proposed state is to comprise six districts in West Bengal and four contiguous districts of Assam which are Cooch Behar, Darjeeling, Jalpaiguri, North and South Dinajpur and Malda of West Bengal and four contiguous districts of Assam – Kokrajhar, Bongaigaon, Dhubri and Goalpara. Certain members of the All Kamtapur Students Union (AKSU) wanted to organise an armed struggle for a separate Kamtapur nation. For this purpose, they approached the United Liberation Front of Asom (ULFA). The KLO was formed to address problems of the Koch Rajbongshi people such as large-scale unemployment, land alienation, perceived neglect of Kamtapuri language, identity, and grievances of economic deprivation.

Bodoland

Bodo Liberation Tigers Force (1996–2003) 

The Bodo Liberation Tigers Force fought for autonomy of Bodoland under Prem Singh Brahma. It surrendered with the establishment of Bodoland Territorial Council.

National Democratic Front of Bodoland  (1986–2020) 

The National Democratic Front of Bodoland (NDFB) was formed in 1986 as the Bodo Security Force, and aims to set up an independent nation of Bodoland. In January 2020, two Bodo separatist groups in Assam, the NDFB and the All Bodo Student's Union (ABSD), signed a peace accord with the Indian government in which they dissolved their organizations in exchange for political and economic demands and legal protections for Bodo language and culture.

Dimaraji (1990s–2009) 

The United Liberation Front of Asom and National Socialist Council of Nagaland helped create the Dimasa National Security Force (DNSF) in the early 1990s. But most DNSF members surrendered in 1995. However Commander-in-Chief Jewel Gorlosa, refused to surrender and launched the Dima Halam Daogah (DHD) an extremist group that functioned in Assam and Nagaland and sought to create a Dimaland or Dimaraji for the Dimasa people. After the peace agreement between the DHD and the central government in the year 2003, the group further broke out and Dima Halam Daogah (Jewel) (DHD(J)) also known as Black Widow was born which was led by Jewel Gorlosa. The Black Widow's declared objective is to create Dimaraji nation for the Dimasa people in Dima Hasao only. However the objective of DHD (Nunisa faction) is to include parts of Cachar, Karbi Anglong, and Nagaon districts in Assam, and sections of Dimapur district in Nagaland. In 2009 the group surrendered en masse to the CRPF and local police, 193 cadres surrendering on 2009-09-12 and another 171 on the 13th.

Nagaland 

In the 1950s, the Naga National Council led a violent unsuccessful insurgency against the Government of India, demanding a separate country for the Naga people, known as Nagalim. The secessionist violence decreased considerably after the formation of the Naga-majority Nagaland state, and more militants surrendered after the Shillong Accord of 1975. However, some Nagas operating under the various factions of the National Socialist Council of Nagaland, continue to demand a separate country.

2014 General Elections of India recorded a voter turnout of more than 87% in Nagaland, which was the highest in India.

Mizoram 
Mizoram's tensions were largely due to the simmering Assamese domination and the neglect of the Mizo people. Many Mizo organizations, like the Mizo Union, had long complained of discrimination at the hands of the Assam Government and demanded a separate state for the Mizos. Currently, the insurgency is due to autonomy demands by the Bru (also known as Reang) people.

Mizo National Front (1966–1986)

Background 
Mizo organizations, including the Mizo Union, had long complained of step-motherly treatment at the hands of the Assam Government. This included the poor handling of the Mautam famine and when the state government made Assamese the official language without any consideration for the Mizo language.

The Mizo National Famine Front, which was originally formed to help the people during the Mautam Famine was converted into Mizo National Front (MNF) on 22 October 1961. Unlike the Mizo Union which demanded a separate state for the Mizos within India, the MNF aimed at establishing a sovereign Christian nation for the Mizos.

Insurgency and reaction 
The MNF formed a special armed wing called the Mizo National Army (MNA) consisting of eight battalions organized on the pattern of the Indian army. MNA consisted of around 2000 men, supported by another group called the Mizo National Volunteers (MNV), which comprised an equal number of irregulars. In the early 1960s, the MNF leaders including Pu Laldenga visited East Pakistan (now Bangladesh), where the Government of Pakistan offered them a supply of military hardware and training.  Laldenga and his lieutenant Pu Lalnunmawia was arrested by Assam but then later released. The MNF members forcibly collected donations from the Mizo people, recruited volunteers and trained them with arms supplied by Pakistan. By the end of 1965, the MNF weapon cache consisted of the plastic explosives stolen from the Border Roads Organization, rifles and ammunition obtained from the 1st Battalion, Assam Rifles, crude bombs and Sten guns.

On 1 March 1966, the Mizo National Front (MNF) declared independence after launching coordinated attacks on government offices and security forces post in different parts of the Mizo district in Assam. The government retaliated by various airstrikes and ground operatives by recapturing all the places seized by the MNF by 25 March 1966.

Aizawl airstrikes 
On the afternoon of 4 March 1966, the IAF jet fighters strafed the MNF targets in Aizawl using machine guns, allegedly causing few civilian casualties. The next day, a more extensive airstrike was carried out for about five hours. According to some Mizos, the planes used incendiary bombs, resulting in fires that destroyed several houses in the Dawrpui and Chhinga Veng areas. According to some other accounts, the houses were destroyed in the fires started by the prisoners released from the Aizawl jail by the insurgents. Apart from Aizawl, the neighbouring villages of Tualbung and Hnahlan were also bombarded. Most of the civilian population fled Aizawl and took refuge in the villages in the adjacent hills.

In the history of independent India, this remains the only instance of the Government of India resorting to airstrikes in its territory.

Post 1966 and end of the secessionist movement 
After 1966, the MNF resorted to low-intensity attacks. The Mizo Union's negotiations with the Union Government resulted in the Mizo district gaining the status of a Union Territory as "Mizoram" on 21 January 1972. MNF's secessionist movement came to an end in 1986, when it signed the Mizo accord with the Government of India. The Government agreed to create a separate state for the Mizos. MNF, in return, decided to give up its secessionist demand and the use of violence. MNF is currently a political party.

Bru National Liberation Front 
Currently, the insurgency status is classified as partially active, due to secessionist/autonomy/union territory demands made by the Chakmas for Chakmabhumi and Reangs for Bruland. The Chakma and Reang tribes complain of religious and ethnic persecution, and complain that the dominant Mizo ethnic group, almost entirely Christian, wants to convert them to Christianity.  Following an ethnic riot with the Mizos in 1997, tens of thousands of Reangs are living as refugees in Tripura and Assam.

In 1997, the Bru National Union (BNU) (formed in 1994) passed a resolution in 1997 demanding an Autonomous District Council (ADC) in the western areas of Mizoram (via the  6th Schedule of the Constitution)  which the Mizoram government and the Young Mizos Association rejected. Some Mizo organizations reacted by demanding that the Brus be left out of the State's electoral rolls as they “are not indigenous to Mizoram". Clashes between the two communities in Mamit district led to the creation of the Bru National Liberation Front (BNLF) in 1996. In October 1997, members of the BNLF kidnapped and murdered a Mizo forest guard in Dampa Tiger Reserve. In reactions to this, ethnic riots took place, between 35,000 and 40,000 Bru villagers were forced to flee Mizoram and seek shelter in camps in Tripura The BNU claimed that 1,391 Bru houses in 41 villages were burnt down and several people were raped and killed whereas the Mizoram police put the number of homes torched at 325 in 16 villages but did not confirm any rape or murder.

The outfit is involved in ransom mostly targeting non-Brus and Mizo Christians, which is a major source of finance for the terrorist group. Besides, the BNLF is also involved in violent attacks against security force personnel. The outfit was also engaged in internecine clashes with other terrorist outfits in the Northeast, like the National Liberation Front of Tripura (NLFT). In 2001, the BNLF and the government of Mizoram opened dialogue for the first time. By 2005, both parties arrived at an agreement that included the BNLF surrendering its arms and repatriation. However, in 2009, the deal fell through after Bru armed groups killed a Mizo youth.

Currently, there have been talks of reparation between the Central Government, Government of Mizoram, Government of Tripura and various Bru organizations. Reparation includes one-time assistance of ₹4 lakh as a fixed deposit within a month of repatriation, monthly cash assistance of ₹5,000 through DBT, free rations for two years, ₹1.5 lakh in three instalments as house-building assistance, certificates for Eklavya residential schools, permanent residential and ST certificates and also funds to the Mizoram government for improving security in the resettlement areas. However, attempts of repartitions have largely failed due to the demand of autonomous councils and the fear of being attacked. Many tribals protested against reparations in favour of permanent settlement in Tripura demanding that the Centre restore their food and cash benefits.

Hmar People's Convention-Democracy (1995–Present) 
The Hmar People's Convention-Democracy (HPC-D) is an armed insurgency group formed in 1995 to create an independent Hmar State. It is the offspring of the Hmar People's Convention (HPC), which entered into an agreement with the Government of Mizoram in 1994 resulting in the formation of the Sinlung Hills Development Council (SHDC) in North Mizoram. Their recruited cadres are from the States where the Hmar people are spread – Assam, Manipur, Mizoram, Tripura and Meghalaya. The HPC(D) is demanding a separate administrative unit as a union territory under the Sixth Schedule of the Constitution of India.

Manipur 

Manipur's long tradition of independence can be traced to the foundation of the Kangleipak State in 1110. The Kingdom of Manipur was conquered by Great Britain following the brief Anglo-Manipuri War of 1891, becoming a British protectorate. The Kingdom of Manipur became part of the Indian Union on 15 October 1949. Manipur's incorporation into the Indian state soon led to the formation of a number of insurgent organizations, seeking the creation of an independent state within the borders of Manipur, and dismissing the merger with India as involuntary. Only after a protracted agitation, it was declared a separate state on 21 January 1972. Despite its statehood, the insurgency continued and on 8 September 1980, Manipur was declared an area of disturbance, when the Indian government imposed the Armed Forces (Special Powers) Act, 1958 on the region; the act still remains in force.

The parallel rise of Naga nationalism in neighboring Nagaland led to the emergence of the National Socialist Council of Nagaland (NSCN) activities in Manipur. Clashes between the Isak-Muivah (NSCN-IM) and Khaplang (NSCN-K) factions further aggravated tensions, as Kuki tribals began creating their own guerrilla groups in order to protect their interests from NSCN attacks. Skirmishes between the two ethnic groups took place during the 1990s. Other ethnic groups such as the Paite, Vaiphei, Pangals and Hmars followed suit establishing militant groups.

Unlike other conflicts in the Northeast, not many ‘surrenders’ have been reported from Manipur, indicating the tight control that the outfits have maintained over their cadres. The groups are armed with an extremely efficient intelligence network and superior fire power. The militants have been able to carve out a number of "liberated" zones across the State. However, by the end of 2007, the security forces had managed to dislodge the militants from most of these zones.

United National Liberation Front (1990–present) 
The United National Liberation Front (UNLF) was founded on 24 November 1964 by Arambam Samarendra Singh to establish a sovereign and socialist Manipur It is one of the oldest insurgent groups in the Northeast. Until 1990 it was only a social organization but took up arms in the early 90s by establishing the Manipur People's Army (MPA). In 1990, a faction led by Namoijam Oken left UNLF and formed the UNLF (Oken group). This led to clashes between the two groups, which caused more than 100 deaths. Later, UNLF (Oken) group merged with splinter groups of the Kangleipak Communist Party (KCP) and the People's Revolutionary Party of Kangleipak (PREPAK) and formed the Kanglei Yawol Kanna Lup (KYKL). The front has also undertaken a social reformation campaign against rampant alcoholism, gambling, drug peddling and drug abuse. It has even helped in solving private and petty disputes and has claimed to have shot more than 50 rapists.

The UNLF has also clashed with NSCN (IM) because of NCSN's demand to include 4 districts of Manipur in creating a "Greater Nagaland" which the UNLF has strongly opposed.

People's United Liberation Front 
The People's United Liberation Front (PULF) is an Islamist organization that was found in 1993. After communal clashes between the Meiteis and the Pangals in the 1993 Pangal massacre, many militant outfits such as the Northeast Minority Front (NEMF), Islamic National Front (INF), Islamic Revolutionary Front (IRF), United Islamic Liberation Army (UILA), Islamic Liberation Front (ILF) and the People's United Liberation Front (PULF) were formed. On May 30, 2007,  the Islamic National Front (INF), merged with the PULF.

The PULF has received arms and raining from the NSCN (IM) in the Ukhrul district and also in Myanmar.

Kuki National Organization 

The Kuki National Organization with its armed wing; the Kuki National Army seeks statehood for Kuki-dominated areas in Manipur within India or a territorial council within Manipur. It has also made claims in Myanmar. It is currently in a ceasefire with the Indian government.

Coordination Committee 
In Manipur the following militant groups have come together as the CorCOM (Short for Coordination Committee.)

 Kangleipak Communist Party (KCP),
 Kanglei Yawol Kanna Lup (KYKL),
 People's Revolutionary Party of Kangleipak (PREPAK)
 People's Revolutionary Party of Kangleipak-Pro (PREPAK-Pro),
 Revolutionary People's Front (RPF)
 United National Liberation Front (UNLF)
 United People's Party of Kangleipak (UPPK)

CorCom is on the extremist organizations list of the Government of India, and is responsible for many bombings usually during Indian holidays and elections.

Arunachal Pradesh 

Insurgency in Arunachal Pradesh had existed due to its close proximity to the Chinese and Burmese border and its diverse ethnic, tribal and religious population. Although currently there are no active local insurgent groups in the state, there are ethnic insecurities among people primarily due to a fear of loss of political dominance and socio-economic benefits.

National Liberation Council of Taniland 
The National Liberation Council of Taniland (NLCT) was active along the Assam – Arunachal Pradesh border, and its members belong to the Tani groups of people and are demanding Taniland. The group enjoys no support from the local population of Arunachal Pradesh and the group is all but defunct now. The group has also received support from the National Socialist Council of Nagaland-Isak-Muivah.  The Tani groups are one of the ethnic groups of northeast India and are also known as known as Mising in Assam and Adi, Nyishi, Galo, Apatani, Tagin, in Arunachal Pradesh as well as the Lhoba in China.

Further reading and viewing 

 List of terrorist groups active in the country – Ministry of Home Affairs
Racine, Jean-Luc (2013). Secessionism in independent India: Failed attempts, irredentism, and accommodations. Secessionism and Separatism in Europe and Asia: To have a state of one's own. Routledge. pp. 147–163.
 YouTuber Soch by Mohak Mangal explaining the Nagaland insurgency: Nagaland's insurgency, explained ft. @But Why. Provides a brief explainer for the movement.
 A. Lanunungsang Ao; From Phizo to Muivah: The Naga National Question; New Delhi 2002
 Blisters on their feet: tales of internally displaced persons in India's North East; Los Angeles [u.a.] 2008; ISBN 978-81-7829-819-1
 Dutta, Anuradha; Assam in the Freedom Movement; Calcutta 1991
 Hazarika, Sanjoy; Strangers of the Mist: Tales of War and Peace from India's Northeast; New Delhi u.a. 1994
 Horam, M.; Naga insurgency: the last thirty years; New Delhi 1988
 International Work Group for Indigenous Affairs (Hrsg.); The Naga nation and its struggle against genocide; Kopenhagen 1986
 Nibedom, Nirmal; The Night of the Guerillas; Delhi 1978
 Srikanth, H.; Thomas, C. J.; Naga Resistance Movement and the Peace Process in Northeast India; in: Peace and Democracy in South Asia, Vol. I (2005)
 Terrorism and separatism in North-East India; Delhi 2004; ISBN 81-7835-261-3
 The Other Burma: Conflict, counter-insurgency and human rights in Northeast India"
 Sinlung
 Insurgencies in Northeast India:Conflict, Co-option, and Change
 Journal of North East India Studies
 Naxalism and its Causes – Jagran Josh
India's Naxalite Insurgency: History, Trajectory, and Implications for U.S.-India Security Cooperation on Domestic Counterinsurgency by Thomas F. Lynch III – Institute for National Strategic Studies.

Notes

References

Sources
 
 
 

Articles with dead external links from April 2021
 
Political organisations based in India